Shorket-e Zormorgh is a village in Khorramabad Rural District, Esfarvarin District, Takestan County, Qazvin Province, Iran. At the 2006 census, its population was 69, in 9 families.

References 

Populated places in Takestan County